Arthur N. Martin (August 31, 1889 – 1961) was a Canadian painter.

An architect, Martin pursued painting and exhibited regularly in the annual art presentations of the Canadian National Exhibition in Toronto. He studied at Jarvis Collegiate Institute in Toronto.  A retrospective of his work was exhibited at Art Gallery of Cobourg, Cobourg, Ontario in 1977.

References

1889 births
1961 deaths
20th-century Canadian painters
20th-century Canadian architects
Canadian male painters
20th-century Canadian male artists